Mount Saddleback is the highest peak in the Darling Range of Western Australia.

Bauxite is mined on the flanks of the peak and processed at Worsley Alumina which has been in operation since 1984.

The entire range is formed by the Darling Fault, a  fault that has been moving continually through its long history with the last major activity occurring 135 million years ago when Australia broke away from the super continent, Gondwana. The Darling Scarp formed around 570 million years ago and is composed of 3700 million-year-old rocks that are mostly granite. Saddleback is found on the eastern side of the fault on the Darling Plateau.

The underlying bedrock is composed of medium grained granite and sometimes Archean aged granitoids. The surface of the mount is an iron-rich hard cap with a thickness of around  containing 40 to 50% Fe2O3 including significant amounts of quartz sand. Below this is a transition zone primarily made up of kaolin clays followed by weathered bedrock.

Above the bedrock the soils are composed of 25–30% bauxite with irregular and lenticular-shaped ore bodies.

References

Saddleback
Darling Range
Mining in Western Australia